George Raymond Dallas Moor,  (22 October 1896 – 3 November 1918) was a recipient of the Victoria Cross, the highest award for gallantry in the face of the enemy that can be awarded to British and Commonwealth forces. He was awarded the Victoria Cross for stemming a rout by shooting four soldiers during the Gallipoli campaign in 1915.

Early life
Moor was born 22 October 1896, in his mother's sister's home in Pollington Street, St Kilda, Australia. He was the son of William Henry Moor (Auditor-General, Transvaal, retired) and Mrs. Moor, and nephew of the late Sir Ralph Moor, formerly High Commissioner for Southern Nigeria. He was educated at Cheltenham College.

First World War
Moor was commissioned into the 3rd Battalion the Hampshire Regiment in October 1914, and was granted a Regular Commission on 1 August 1915. After six months' training in England and Egypt, he went with the 2nd Battalion to the Dardanelles, and was at the landing at V Beach at Gallipoli on 25 April 1915.

His Victoria Cross was gazetted on 24 July 1915, when he was 18 years of age. The citation read:

Lieutenant General Sir Beauvoir de Lisle, in a narrative of Moor's VC action, said, "I have often quoted this young Officer as being one of the bravest men I have met in this War."

Moor was invalided home soon afterwards suffering from dysentery. After recovering he joined the 1st Battalion in France and was badly wounded in the arm. He returned to England, and before regaining the use of his arm was appointed Aide-de-Camp to Major General W. de L. Williams in France, where he gained the Military Cross and Bar. Moor was promoted lieutenant on 30 October 1916.

His Military Cross citation, gazetted 2 December 1918, reads:

The award of a Bar to his Military Cross was promulgated on 29 July 1919, reading:

Moor died of Spanish Influenza at Mouvaux, France, on 3 November 1918. He is buried in the Y Farm Military Cemetery, Bois-Grenier, which is cared for by the Commonwealth War Graves Commission. The inscription on his gravestone reads: VINCAM ET VINCAM. A copy of his Victoria Cross is displayed at the Royal Hampshire Regiment Museum in Winchester, England.

References

External links
George MOOR of Cheltenham College

1896 births
1918 deaths
Military personnel from Melbourne
British Army personnel of World War I
People educated at Cheltenham College
Royal Hampshire Regiment officers
British military personnel killed in World War I
Deaths from the Spanish flu pandemic in France
Gallipoli campaign recipients of the Victoria Cross
Recipients of the Military Cross
British Army recipients of the Victoria Cross